The  is a river that flows through the Ōita Prefecture in Japan. In its lower reaches it provides the boundary to the Fukuoka Prefecture to the west.

The Yamakuni River arises on the slopes of the sacred Mount Hiko on the border of Oita and Fukuoka prefectures, flowing towards the sea through the Yabakei and Nakatsu plains, and empties into the Seto Inland Sea. Tributaries include the Yamaoi River, Atoda River and Yamautsuri River.

Structures

The Yabakei Dam on a tributary, the Yamautsuri River, and Heisei Ozeki Barrage, help control the river system.

The Yabakei Bridge over it, is the longest stone bridge in Japan.

Tourism
It runs through the Yabakei Gorge (Shinyabakei Gorge) and is adjacent to Aonodōmon (Blue Tunnel) in the Yaba-Hita-Hikosan Quasi-National Park. Its upper reaches include the scenic Marinkyo Gorge.

History
Significant floods have occurred in September 1944 (typhoon), September 1993 (typhoon) and July 2012. Drought is also frequent and was recorded in 9 of the first 31 years after the construction of the Heisei flood barrier.

References

Rivers of Fukuoka Prefecture
Rivers of Ōita Prefecture
Rivers of Japan